is an athletic stadium in Miki, Hyōgo, Japan.

It was used J2 League games.

References

External links

Athletics (track and field) venues in Japan
Sports venues in Hyōgo Prefecture
Football venues in Japan
Miki, Hyōgo
Sports venues completed in 2005
2005 establishments in Japan